Pascal Van Hentenryck (born 8 March 1963) is the A. Russell Chandler III Chair and Professor of Industrial and Systems Engineering at Georgia Tech. He is credited with pioneering advances in constraint programming and stochastic optimization, bridging theory and practice to solve real-world problems across a range of domains including sports scheduling, protein folding, kidney matching, disaster relief, power systems, recommender systems, and transportation. He has developed several optimization technologies including CHIP, Numerica, the Optimization Programming Language (OPL - now an IBM product), and Comet. He has also published several books, including Online Stochastic Combinatorial Optimization, Hybrid Optimization, and Constraint-Based Local Search.

Van Hentenryck is an AAAI and INFORMS fellow and has received numerous awards and honorary degrees for his contributions to optimization and artificial intelligence.

Career 
Pascal Van Hentenryck was born in Belgium and obtained his PhD in Computer Science from the University of Namur in 1986. He joined Brown University’s Department of Computer Science in 1990 after spending four years at the European Computer-Industry Research Center where he led development of the CHIP system. In 1993, he was awarded an NSF National Young Investigator Award. Van Hentenryck spent the next several years at Brown developing new optimization technologies to address open problems in vehicle routing, disaster relief, and power systems management.

In 2009, Van Hentenryck co-founded Dynadec, a spin-off company based on optimization technologies he developed at Brown. In 2012, Van Hentenryck left Brown to lead the 70-person Optimization Research Group at NICTA in Australia until its merger with CSIRO in 2015.

Van Hentenryck joined the University of Michigan in 2015. At Michigan, his work spanned several areas, including power systems, transportation, and computational social science. In 2017, Van Hentenryck ran the Seth Bonder Data Science Summer Camp for High School Students. In 2018, he launched RITMO, a new transportation system for the University of Michigan’s campus. 

Van Hentenryck has also taught a Massive Open Online Course on Discrete Optimization.

Honors and awards 
In 2002, Van Hentenryck received the INFORMS ICS Award for research excellence in optimizations research and computer science, and in 2004, he was awarded an IBM Faculty Award. In 2006, Van Hentenryck received the ACP award for research excellence in Constraint Programming. In 2008, he was awarded an honorary doctorate from the University of Louvain, and in 2011, an honorary degree from the University of Nantes. He has received several best paper awards including at CP ‘03, CP ‘04, IJCAI ‘07, SEDE ‘09, AAAI ‘15, and CP ‘16. He has also received awards for outstanding contributions to teaching and education, including the Philip J. Bray Award for Teaching Excellence in 2010 at Brown, and the 2013 IFORS Distinguished Lecturer Award.
He was elected to the 2016 class of Fellows of the Institute for Operations Research and the Management Sciences.

References 

1963 births
Living people
Belgian computer scientists
Brown University faculty
Fellows of the Association for the Advancement of Artificial Intelligence
Fellows of the Institute for Operations Research and the Management Sciences
Georgia Tech faculty
University of Michigan faculty
Université de Namur alumni